Caladenia radiata, commonly known as the ray spider orchid, is a species of orchid endemic to the south-west of Western Australia. It has a single erect, hairy leaf and one or two green, yellow and red flowers. It flowers more profusely after fire and grows in swampy areas, sometimes flowering whilst in water.

Description 
The lateral sepals and petals have about the same dimensions as the dorsal sepal and turn stiffly downwards. Flowering occurs from October to early December.

Taxonomy and naming 
Caladenia radiata was first described in 1948 by William Nicholls from a specimen collected near Yarloop and the description was published in The Victorian Naturalist. The specific epithet (radiata) is derived from the Latin word radius meaning "ray", "rod" or "spoke", referring to the spreading teeth on the sides of the labellum.

Distribution and habitat 
The ray spider orchid is found between the Yarloop and Albany in the Avon Wheatbelt, Jarrah Forest, Swan Coastal Plain and Warren biogeographic regions where it grows in swampy areas, often flowering in standing water.

Conservation 
Caladenia radiata is classified as "not threatened" by the Western Australian Government Department of Parks and Wildlife.

References 

radiata
Endemic orchids of Australia
Orchids of Western Australia
Plants described in 1948
Endemic flora of Western Australia